Signaling peptide receptor is a type of receptor which binds one or more signaling peptides or signaling proteins.

An example is the tropomyosin receptor kinase B (TrkB), which is bound and activated by the neurotrophic protein brain-derived neurotrophic factor (BDNF). Another example is the μ-opioid receptor (MOR), which is bound and activated by the opioid peptide hormone β-endorphin.

Adiponectin receptor

AdipoR1 

 Agonists
 Peptide
 Adiponectin
 ADP-355
 ADP-399
 Non-peptide
 AdipoRon
 (–)-Arctigenin
 Arctiin
 Gramine
 Matairesinol
 Antagonists
 Peptide
 ADP-400

AdipoR2 

 Agonists
 Peptide
 Adiponectin
 ADP-355
 ADP-399
 Non-peptide
 AdipoRon
 Deoxyschizandrin
 Parthenolide
 Syringing
 Taxifoliol
 Antagonists
 Peptide
 ADP-400

Angiotensin receptor

Bradykinin receptor 

 Agonists
 Bradykinin
 Kallidin
 Antagonists
 FR-173657
 Icatibant
 LF22-0542

Calcitonin gene-related peptide receptor 

 Agonists
 Amylin
 CGRP
 Pramlintide
 Antagonists
 Atogepant
 BI 44370 TA
 CGRP (8-37)
 MK-3207
 Olcegepant
 Rimegepant
 SB-268262
 Telcagepant
 Ubrogepant
 Antibodies
 Eptinezumab
 Erenumab
 Fremanezumab
 Galcanezumab

Cholecystokinin receptor

CCKA 

 Agonists
 Cholecystokinin
 Antagonists
 Amiglumide
 Asperlicin
 Devazepide
 Dexloxiglumide
 Lintitript
 Lorglumide
 Loxiglumide
 Pranazepide
 Proglumide
 Tarazepide
 Tomoglumide

CCKB 

 Agonists
 Cholecystokinin
 CCK-4
 Gastrin
 Pentagastrin (CCK-5)
 Antagonists
 Ceclazepide
 CI-988 (PD-134308)
 Itriglumide
 L-365,360
 Netazepide
 Proglumide
 Spiroglumide

Unsorted 
 Antagonists
 Nastorazepide

Corticotropin-releasing hormone receptor

CRF1 

 Agonists
 Cortagine
 Corticorelin
 Corticotropin-releasing hormone
 Sauvagine
 Stressin I
 Urocortin
 Antagonists
 Antalarmin
 Astressin-B
 CP-154,526
 Emicerfont
 Hypericin
 LWH-234
 NBI-27914
 NBI-74788
 Pexacerfont
 R-121919
 TS-041
 Verucerfont

CRF2 

 Agonists
 Corticorelin
 Corticotropin-releasing hormone
 Sauvagine
 Urocortin
 Antagonists
 Astressin-B

Cytokine receptor

Endothelin receptor 

 Agonists
 Endothelin 1
 Endothelin 2
 Endothelin 3
 IRL-1620
 Sarafotoxin
 Antagonists
 A-192621
 ACT-132577
 Ambrisentan
 Aprocitentan
 Atrasentan
 Avosentan
 Bosentan
 BQ-123
 BQ-788
 Clazosentan
 Darusentan
 Edonentan
 Enrasentan
 Fandosentan
 Feloprentan
 Macitentan
 Nebentan
 Sitaxentan
 Sparsentan
 Tezosentan
 Zibotentan

Galanin receptor

GAL1 

 Agonists
 Galanin
 Galanin (1-15)
 Galanin-like peptide
 Galmic
 Galnon
 NAX 810-2
 Antagonists
 C7
 Dithiepine-1,1,4,4-tetroxide
 Galantide (M15)
 M32
 M35
 M40
 SCH-202596

GAL2 

 Agonists
 Galanin
 Galanin (1-15)
 Galanin (2-11)
 Galanin-like peptide
 Galmic
 Galnon
 J18
 NAX 810-2
 Antagonists
 C7
 Galantide (M15)
 M32
 M35
 M40
 M871

GAL3 

 Agonists
 Galanin
 Galanin (1-15)
 Galmic
 Galnon
 Antagonists
 C7
 Galantide (M15)
 GalR3ant
 HT-2157
 M32
 M35
 M40
 SNAP-37889
 SNAP-398299

Growth hormone secretagogue receptor

Growth hormone receptor

Growth-hormone-releasing hormone receptor

Glucagon-like peptide receptor

GLP-1 

 Agonists
 Albiglutide
 Beinaglutide
 Dulaglutide
 Efpeglenatide
 Exenatide
 GLP-1
 Langlenatide
 Liraglutide
 Lixisenatide
 Oxyntomodulin
 Pegapamodutide
 Semaglutide
 Taspoglutide

GLP-2 

 Agonists
 Apraglutide
 Elsiglutide
 Glepaglutide
 GLP-2
 Teduglutide

Others 
 Propeptides
 Preproglucagon
 Proglucagon

Glucagon receptor 

 Agonists
 Dasiglucagon
 Glucagon
 Oxyntomodulin
 Antagonists
 Adomeglivant
 L-168,049
 LGD-6972
 Propeptides
 Preproglucagon
 Proglucagon

Gonadotropin-releasing hormone receptor

Gonadotropin receptor

Growth factor receptor

Insulin receptor 

 Agonists
 Chaetochromin (4548-G05)
 Insulin-like growth factor 1
 Insulin-like growth factor 2
 Insulin
 Insulin aspart
 Insulin degludec
 Insulin detemir
 Insulin glargine
 Insulin glulisine
 Insulin lispro
 Mecasermin
 Mecasermin rinfabate
 Antagonists
 BMS-754807
 S661
 S961
 Kinase inhibitors
 Linsitinib
 Antibodies
 Xentuzumab (against IGF-1 and IGF-2)

KiSS1-derived peptide receptor 

 Agonists
 Kisspeptin (kisspeptin-54, metastin)
 Kisspeptin-10
 KISS1-305
 MVT-602 (RVT-602, TAK-448)
 TAK-683
 Antagonists
 Kisspeptin-234

Leptin receptor 

 Agonists
 Leptin
 Metreleptin

Melanin-concentrating hormone receptor

MCH1 

 Agonists
 Melanin-concentrating hormone
 Antagonists
 ATC-0065
 ATC-0175
 GW-803430
 NGD-4715
 SNAP-7941
 SNAP-94847

MCH2 

 Agonists
 Melanin-concentrating hormone

Melanocortin receptor

Neuropeptide FF receptor 

 Agonists
 Neuropeptide AF
 Neuropeptide FF
 Neuropeptide SF (RFRP-1)
 Neuropeptide VF (RFRP-3)
 Antagonists
 BIBP-3226
 RF9

Neuropeptide S receptor 

 Agonists
 Neuropeptide S
 Antagonists
 ML-154
 SHA-68

Neuropeptide Y receptor

Y1 

 Agonists
 Neuropeptide Y
 Peptide YY
 Antagonists
 BIBO-3304
 BIBP-3226
 BVD-10
 GR-231118
 PD-160170

Y2 

 Agonists
 2-Thiouridine 5'-triphosphate
 Neuropeptide Y
 Neuropeptide Y (13-36)
 Peptide YY
 Peptide YY (3-36)
 Antagonists
 BIIE-0246
 JNJ-5207787
 SF-11

Y4 
 Agonists
 GR-231118
 Neuropeptide Y
 Pancreatic polypeptide
 Peptide YY
 Antagonists
 UR-AK49

Y5 

 Agonists
 BWX-46
 Neuropeptide Y
 Peptide YY
 Antagonists
 CGP-71683
 FMS-586
 L-152,804
 Lu AA-33810
 MK-0557
 NTNCB
 Velneperit (S-2367)

Neurotensin receptor

NTS1 

 Agonists
 Neurotensin
 Neuromedin N
 Antagonists
 Meclinertant
 SR-142948

NTS2 

 Agonists
 Neurotensin
 Antagonists
 Levocabastine
 SR-142948

Opioid receptor

Orexin receptor

Oxytocin receptor

Prolactin receptor

Parathyroid hormone receptor 

 Agonists
 Abaloparatide
 Parathyroid hormone
 Parathyroid hormone-related protein (PTHrP)
 Semparatide
 Teriparatide

Relaxin receptor 

 Agonists
 Insulin-like factor 3
 Relaxin (1, 2, 3)
 Serelaxin

Somatostatin receptor

Tachykinin receptor

Thyrotropin-releasing hormone receptor 

 Agonists
 Azetirelin
 JTP-2942
 Montirelin
 Orotirelin
 Posatirelin
 Protirelin
 Rovatirelin
 RX-77368 (thymoliberin)
 Taltirelin
 TRH (TRF)

Thyrotropin receptor 

 Agonists
 Thyrotropin alfa
 TSH (thyrotropin)

Vasopressin receptor

Vasoactive intestinal peptide receptor and Pituitary adenylate cyclase-activating peptide

VIPR1 

 Agonists
 Peptide
 Bay 55-9837
 LBT-3393
 PACAP
 VIP

VIPR2 

 Agonists
 Peptide
 LBT-3627
 PACAP
 VIP

PAC1 

 Agonists
 PACAP
 PACAP (1-27)
 PACAP (1-38)
 Antagonists
 PACAP (6-38)

Unsorted 
 PHI
 PHM
 PHV

Others 
 Endogenous
 Adrenomedullin
 Apelin
 Asprosin
 Bombesin
 Calcitonin
 Carnosine
 CART
 CLIP
 DSIP
 Enteroglucagon
 Formyl peptide
 GALP
 GIP
 GRP
 Integrin ligands
 collagens
 fibrinogen
 fibronectin
 laminins
 ICAM-1
 ICAM-2
 osteopontin
 VCAM-1
 vitronectin
 Kininogens
 Motilin
 Natriuretic peptides 
 ANP
 BNP
 CNP
 urodilatin
 Nesfatin-1
 Neuromedin B
 Neuromedin N
 Neuromedin S
 Neuromedin U
 Obestatin
 Osteocalcin
 Resistin
 Secretin
 Thymopoietin
 Thymosins
 Thymulin
 Urotensin-II
 VGF
 Exogenous
 Lifitegrast (LFA-1 antagonist)

See also
 Neuropeptide receptor
 Neurotransmitter receptor

References

External links
 

Peptides
Receptors